Ian Donovan (born July 7, 1976) is a Canadian politician who was an elected member to the Legislative Assembly of Alberta representing the electoral district of Little Bow. Donovan was the Agriculture and Rural Development Critic with the Wildrose Official Opposition, until leaving the caucus in November 2014 to sit as a Progressive Conservative.  On May 5, 2015, Donovan lost his reelection bid to Dave Schneider, of the Wildrose.

Early life 
Donovan was born in High River and calls the hamlet of Mossleigh home. A graduate of Senator Riley high school, he has operated a grain farm in Mossleigh for 29 years. His wife Serena is now a town councillor. In addition to him running his farm, he is a long-time member and former director of the Blackie Seed Cleaning Association. Donovan is an active member of his community, having been involved with the Lions Club of Mossleigh and Community Futures Highwood, a nonprofit community-owned business development organization, for the past 15 years. He also served as councillor for division 9 of Vulcan County from 1995 until his election to the Legislative Assembly of Alberta, April 23, 2012. He became MLA of the Little Bow Riding. Donovan was appointed to the Standing Committee on Public Accounts on May 24, 2012. He was appointed to the Standing Committee on Alberta's Economic Future on May 28, 2012.

Political career
Donovan started on Vulcan County council at the age of 19. During his 16 years on council he was reeve for two years, chair of public works, agriculture service board, and was on the planning commission. Other boards he was involved with was Blackie and district seed cleaning co-op, Community Futures Highwood, South grow, Vulcan business Development board, Northwest Fire protection association, and the Mossleigh Lions Club.

Donovan ran for a seat to the Legislative Assembly of Alberta in the 2012 Alberta general election,on April 23, 2012.> Donovan won the general election defeating three other candidates with over half the popular vote.

Premier Alison Redford credited Donovan persuading her to allow the Canadian Taxpayers Federation into the pre-budget release lockup, where journalists and stakeholders receive embargoed copies of the budget prior to being released to the public, after he sent the Premier a hand written note in the legislative assembly. Wildrose had previously offered to bring the CTF on a $1 day long contract to the lockup before Redford's decision to allow the group to attend.

On November 24, 2014, Donovan left the Wildrose Party and "crossed the floor" of the Alberta Legislature to join the governing Alberta Progressive Conservative Party caucus under the direction of Danielle Smith, who asked all of the Wildrose party to dissolve and join the Conservative party... The move was interpreted by the media in the context of the recent election of Jim Prentice as Alberta PC leader, the loss by Wildrose of four recent byelections, and controversy over the handling of an equality rights resolution at the Wildrose Party's recent convention.  On February 8, 2015, Donovan was acclaimed the candidate for the Progressive Conservative Party for the constituency of Little Bow in the next provincial election when no one else offered to challenge him for the nomination. He lost the general election to Dave Schneider of Wildrose by 12 votes.

In the 2019 election, after Wildrose and the Progressive Conservatives merger, Donovan ran as an independent, and came in a weak third behind the United Conservative and New Democratic candidates, with 4.5% of the vote.

Electoral record

2019 general election

2015 general election

2012 general election

References

External links
Ian Donovan homepage

1976 births
Living people
People from High River
Progressive Conservative Association of Alberta MLAs
Wildrose Party MLAs
21st-century Canadian politicians